The Pan American records in Olympic weightlifting are maintained in each weight class for the snatch lift, clean & jerk lift, and the total for both lifts by the Pan American Weightlifting Federation (PAWF).

Current records
Key to tables:

Men

Women

Historical records

Men (1998–2018)

Women (1998–2018)

 Koppel was not part of the official competition as Argentina is not an African country and her results were not recorded by the IWF. It's unclear why and how Koppel competed there and why the PAWC recognizes the results.

References
General
Pan American Records 16 December 2022 updated
Specific

External links
PAWC web site

Americas
Weightlifting in North America
Weightlifting in South America
Weightlifting